Shek Wai Kok is a hilly area at the northeast of Tsuen Wan in Hong Kong.

History
Both the original Shek Wai Kok and Lo Wai villages have been described as the oldest villages of Tsuen Wan.

In late 19th Century, it was one of four yeuk in Tsuen Wan, together with Hoi Pa, Kwai Chung and Tsing Yi. The heads of four yeuks formed the Tsuen Wan Security Council to secure the area of Tsuen Wan.

The area was historically occupied by villages, which were relocated to Wo Yi Hop Road near Lei Muk Shue Estate in Kwai Chung and called Shek Wai Kok Sun Village, since the construction of public housing estate, Shek Wai Kok Estate.

Administration
Shek Wai Kok is a recognized village under the New Territories Small House Policy.

Features
Northern Shek Wai Kok attracts Taoist building their temples among the hills.

Education
Shek Wai Kok is in Primary One Admission (POA) School Net 62, which includes schools in Tsuen Wan and areas nearby. The net includes multiple aided schools and one government school, Hoi Pa Street Government Primary School.

References

External links

 Delineation of area of existing village Shek Wai Kok (Tsuen Wan) for election of resident representative (2019 to 2022)

 
Places in Hong Kong
Tsuen Wan